Helmut Schneider (17 July 1913 – 13 February 1984) was a German footballer and manager who played as a defender, midfielder or forward and made one appearance for the Germany national team.

Club career
Schneider played for TuS Altrip, Bayern Munich, Waldhof Mannheim, SpVgg Fürth (two stints), LSV Berlin, Berliner SV 1892 and Mainz 05 during his career. He also played for an unknown club in Ostmark (Austria) during the 1941–42 season. He won the Gauliga Baden in 1935–36 and 1936–37 with Mannheim, where he played as a left winger, inside forward or centre-forward, and was a member of the team which lost to 1. FC Nürnberg in the 1939 Tschammerpokal Final.

International career
Schneider earned his first and only cap for Germany on 1 September 1940 in a friendly against Finland. The home match, which took place in Leipzig, finished as a 13–0 win for Germany.

Managerial career
Schneider began his managerial career in 1946, working as a player-manager at Mainz 05, and from 1948 with SpVgg Fürth. During his studies for earning his managerial license, he also briefly coached at VfL Köln 99 in 1948. He continued to manage Fürth for another season after ending his playing career until 1951. He continued his career with VfR Mannheim, 1. FC Köln, three spells at FK Pirmasens, two spells at Borussia Dortmund, Bayern Munich, 1. FC Saarbrücken, Karlsruher SC and Wormatia Worms. With Dortmund, he helped the club win their first two German titles in 1956 and 1957.

Personal life
Schneider was born on 17 July 1913 in Altrip. He died on 13 February 1984 in Mannheim at the age of 70.

Career statistics

International

References

External links
 
 
 
 
 
 

1913 births
1984 deaths
People from Rhein-Pfalz-Kreis
Footballers from Rhineland-Palatinate
German footballers
Germany international footballers
Association football defenders
Association football midfielders
Association football forwards
TuS Altrip players
FC Bayern Munich footballers
SV Waldhof Mannheim players
SpVgg Greuther Fürth players
LSV Berlin players
Berliner SV 1892 players
1. FSV Mainz 05 players
German football managers
Association football player-managers
1. FSV Mainz 05 managers
VfL Köln 99 managers
SpVgg Greuther Fürth managers
VfR Mannheim managers
1. FC Köln managers
FK Pirmasens managers
Borussia Dortmund managers
FC Bayern Munich managers
1. FC Saarbrücken managers
Karlsruher SC managers
Wormatia Worms managers
Bundesliga managers